Vladimir Drobot is a retired Ukrainian football player.

Career
Volodymyr Kolomiets started his career in 1991 with Desna Chernihiv, the main club in the city of Chernihiv. In 1995 he played 4 matches with Tekstylnyk Chernihiv, another club in Chernihiv. In 1999 he moved back to Desna Chernihiv until 1999. In summer 1999 he moved to Poligraftekhnika Oleksandriya in the Ukrainian First League where he played 8 matches. In the same season he moved Dnipro Cherkasy where he played 5 matches and here he ended his career.

Honours
Desna Chernihiv
 Ukrainian Second League: 1996–97

References

External links 
 Vladimir Drobot at footballfacts.ru

1972 births
Living people
Footballers from Chernihiv
FC Desna Chernihiv players
FC Cheksyl Chernihiv players
FC Oleksandriya players
FC Dnipro Cherkasy players
Ukrainian footballers
Ukrainian Second League players
Association football defenders